This is a list of notable events in Latin music (i.e. Spanish- and Portuguese-speaking music from Latin America, Latin Europe, and the United States) that took place in 2008.

Events
January 1Due to declining sales of Latin albums in the United States, the RIAA lowers the threshold for its Latin certifications: 50,000 for disco de oro, 100,000 for disco de platino, and 200,000 or more for disco de multi-platino. All albums previously certified under the RIAA's Latin program were amended to match the current threshold.
November 13 The 9th Annual Latin Grammy Awards are held at the Toyota Center in Houston, Texas.
Colombian singer-songwriter Juanes is the most awarded artist of the song with his "Me Enamora" winning the awards for Record of the Year and Song of the Year as well as Album of the Year for the La Vida... Es Un Ratico. 
Kany García wins Best New Artist.
Gloria Estefan is honored as the Latin Recording Academy Person of the Year.

Number-ones albums and singles by country
List of number-one singles of 2008 (Spain)
List of number-one Billboard Top Latin Albums of 2008
List of number-one Billboard Hot Latin Songs of 2008

Awards
2008 Premio Lo Nuestro
2008 Billboard Latin Music Awards
2008 Latin Grammy Awards
2008 Tejano Music Awards

Albums released

First quarter

January

February

March

Second quarter

April

May

June

Third quarter

July

August

September

Fourth quarter

October

November

December

Unknown dates

Best-selling records

Best-selling albums
The following is a list of the top 10 best-selling Latin albums in the United States in 2008, according to Billboard.

Best-performing songs
The following is a list of the top 10 best-performing Latin songs in the United States in 2008, according to Billboard.

Deaths

References 

 
Latin music by year